Siedliszcze may refer to the following places:
Siedliszcze, Gmina Dubienka in Lublin Voivodeship (east Poland)
Siedliszcze, Gmina Siedliszcze in Lublin Voivodeship (east Poland)
Siedliszcze, Włodawa County in Lublin Voivodeship (east Poland)
Siedliszcze, Pomeranian Voivodeship (north Poland)